The 2021 Melbourne Cup (known commercially as the 2021 Lexus Melbourne Cup) was the 161st running of the Melbourne Cup, a prestigious Australian Thoroughbred horse race.

The final field for the race was declared on 30 October 2021. The total prize money for the race was A$8 million, the same as the previous year.

Due to the COVID-19 pandemic, the public crowd was limited to 10,000 vaccinated attendees. Also, all horses are required fully CT scan to permit run the Melbourne Cup.

The race was won by Verry Elleegant, ridden by James McDonald and trained by Chris Waller. She became the first horse in 161 runnings of the cup to win from barrier 18.

Field

References

Melbourne Cup
Melbourne Cup
Melbourne Cup
2020s in Melbourne